Corregidor Caldera is an extinct volcanic caldera located at the entrance to Manila Bay in the Philippines. The caldera is composed of the islands of Corregidor and Caballo in the province of Cavite, which are believed to be the exposed rim of the volcano.

Physical features

Predominant rock type is dacite with a 72.68% silica dioxide content.

Eruption
Last eruption was about 1 million years (1.10 +/-0.09 Ma) BP based on the age of deposits.

Listings
The Philippine Institute of Volcanology and Seismology (PHIVOLCS) lists the volcano as potentially active. The reason for this listing rather than inactive, is not disclosed on the PHIVOLCS website listing.

Corregidor is not listed with the Smithsonian Institution's Global Volcanism Program as it has no known eruptions in the Holocene epoch (around 10,000 years ago).

See also
List of volcanoes in the Philippines

References

External links
 

Corregidor
Volcanoes of Luzon
Potentially active volcanoes of the Philippines
Manila Bay
Landforms of Cavite
Pleistocene calderas
Calderas of the Philippines